This is a list of fictional colleges of either:

 the universities referred to collectively as Oxbridge, but where the specific university is not specified or known;
 fictional institutions spanning both Oxford and Cambridge universities; or
 a fictional Oxbridge University

Boniface College, Oxbridge Pendennis by William Thackeray, inspired by his time at Cambridge and home to the poet Sprott.
Fernham College, Oxbridge A Room of One's Own by Virginia Woolf, based on Newnham College, established in 1871 as the first exclusive women's college at Cambridge University.
Footlights College, Oxbridge from which came a team of participants in an imitation of University Challenge in an episode of The Young Ones called "Bambi". Stephen Fry, Hugh Laurie, Emma Thompson and Ben Elton played contestants: "Lord Snot", "Lord Monty", "Miss Money-Sterling", and "Mr. Kendall-Mintcake", respectively. Fry, Laurie and Thompson were all students at Cambridge and members of its Footlights Dramatic Club.
Omnibus College in Middlemarch, Chapter 52, where Fred Vincy takes his bachelor's degree.
Pembridge College, Oxbridge: The Passing of Sherlock Holmes; by E. V. Knox
St Luke's College "The Adventure of the Three Students", a Sherlock Holmes story by Arthur Conan Doyle.

In The Masters by C. P. Snow, the author decries the use of a fictional name for the college where the events he describes take place as being the "Christminster" convention, Christminster being the fictional version of Oxford in Thomas Hardy's Wessex.

See also
 List of fictional Cambridge colleges
 List of fictional Oxford colleges

References

Fictional universities and colleges
Lists of fictional things
Cambridge in fiction
University of Oxford in fiction
Fictional colleges of the University of Oxford
Fictional colleges of the University of Cambridge
University of Cambridge in fiction
Fictional colleges
Fictional colleges